National Planning Commission may refer to
 Planning Commission (India)
 National Planning Commission of Namibia
 National Planning Commission of Nigeria
 Planning Commission (Pakistan)
 National Planning Commission of South Africa
 National Planning Commission of Nepal

See also
 State Planning Commission (disambiguation)